Machesney Airport  was a small rural airport located in Machesney Park, Illinois, United States.

History
The airport was organized by Fred Machesney in 1927. The airfield was used during World War II by the US military as a stopover for fighter planes heading to the Soviet Union. The airfield had a few buildings and a restaurant. Aircraft parked on the dirt and grass ramp and took off on a grass runway.

In the early 1960s, the airport offered flying lessons for $12 an hour, using circa 1939 Aeronca Champs as trainers. At least two of the instructors, Vince Block and Van Guilder, had been barnstormers, like the airport owner.

A tornado in 1966 damaged hangars and aircraft at the airport.

Decline and redevelopment
After the Greater Rockford Airport opened, business at Machesney Airport declined, and it closed in 1974.

The name of the airport founder was used to name the new Machesney Park Village, formed within the bounds of what is still called North Park. After closing, the airport property was used to house the Machesney Park Mall.

References

Airports in Illinois
Defunct airports in Illinois
Transportation buildings and structures in Winnebago County, Illinois